Barbara Jane Anderson is a New Zealand ecologist.

Education 
Anderson graduated with a PhD in botany from the University of Otago, Dunedin, in 2006.

Research and career 
Beginning in 2015, Anderson co-ordinates a citizen science project, the Ahi Pepe MothNet project which encourages members of the public to engage with moths at Orokonui Ecosanctuary. The project brought public attention to the role of moths in the ecosystem and also provides schoolchildren and adults with an experience of "hands-on" science. As a result of the interest in the project, a bilingual Māori–English guide to New Zealand moths was published in 2018. In 2017, a group of Dunedin schoolchildren were invited to present their experiences of the project to the World Indigenous People's Conference on Education in Toronto. 

Anderson is the President of The Otago Institute for the Arts and Sciences. 

Anderson is a Royal Society Rutherford Discovery Fellow based at the Otago Museum working with the museum's insect collection.

Notable achievements 
In 2019 Anderson had the New Zealand endemic moth species Ichneutica barbara named in her honour.

References

21st-century New Zealand women scientists
University of Otago alumni
Science communicators
Year of birth missing (living people)
Living people
Women ecologists